Butin may refer to:

Places
 Mount Butin in Iraqi Kurdistan
 Origny-le-Butin, a commune in the Orne department in northwestern France
 Butin, a village in Gătaia town, Timiș County, Romania

Other uses
 Butin (surname) 
 Butin (molecule), a flavanone

See also
 Butyne, two chemical compounds